HSwMS Fylgia was an armored cruiser of the Swedish Navy. Launched in 1905, the ship was in service until 1953. The cruiser was primarily used as a training ship for naval cadets.

Construction and career

Fylgias keel was laid by Bergsunds Mekaniska Verkstad in October 1902. She was launched on 20 December 1905 at Finnboda slip at Nacka. The ship was commissioned on 21 June 1907. Upon her commissioning, she was the smallest true armored cruiser in the world. She was commonly used as a cadet training ship following World War I.

On 12 December 1927, Fylgia collided with the Brazilian cargo ship  at Salvador, Bahia, Brazil. Itapura sank, but all 40 members of her crew were rescued.

Extensive Modernisation

Fylgia was modernized in 1939–1940. Her 12 coal fired Yarrow-type boilers were replaced with four oil fueled Phenoët-type boilers. The three high stacks were replaced by two lower ones. The main battery's range was extended and a new fire control with central gun control was added. The air defense was completely revamped: the old 57 mm guns were removed and replaced with four 57 mm M/89B-38B anti-aircraft guns. Two dual 40 mm m/36 gyro-stabilized mounts were added and one dual 25 mm m/32 and one 20 mm m/40 guns were also installed.

After the refit she was assigned to the neutrality watch. Fylgia served into the 1950s as a cadet training ship, until 1953 when she was decommissioned. Fylgia was sold for scrap in 1957.

Captains
1915–1916: Fredrik Riben
1919–1920: Gunnar Unger
1922–1923: Claës Lindsström
1925–1925: Nils Åkerblom
1925–1926: Arvid Hägg
1927–1928: Nils Åkerblom
1931–1932: Lave Beck-Friis
1933–1934: Magnus von Arbin
1948–1948: Gunnar Fogelberg

Notes

References

Cruisers of the Swedish Navy
Ships built in Sweden
1905 ships
Maritime incidents in 1927